Ithaya Geetham is a 1950 Indian Tamil-language historical romance film written, directed and produced by Joseph Thaliath Jr. The film stars T.R. Mahalingam and T. R. Rajakumari.

Plot 
A king is on his deathbed. He requests his friend to take care of the queen (Rajalakshmi) and their daughter (Rajakumari). The friend has two sons. While the elder son (Veerappa) goes to fight a battle, the younger son (Mahalingam) and the princess fall in love with each other. The elder son returns victoriously and claims the hand of the princess. The princess vacillates. So the younger brother goes to another battle. But he gets injured. The princess realises her folly and helps in the treatment of the younger brother. The two brothers decide to settle on a duel. The younger brother wins and marries the princess.

Cast 
Credits adapted from The Hindu review article and from the song book.

Male cast
 T. R. Mahalingam as Jeevan
 P. S. Veerappa as Prathaban
 K. Sarangapani as Lala
 M. G. Chakrapani as Minister
 C. V. Nayagam as Udaya Singh
 C. V. V. Panthulu as Ananda Singh
 K. P. Kamakshi as Dhathan
 Thirupathi as Ananda Singh's minister
 Stunt Somu & Battling Swaminathan

Female cast
 T. R. Rajakumari as Thara
 T. P. Rajalakshmi as Thara's mother
 V. Susheela as Ragini
 T. S. Jaya as Leela
Dance
 Lalitha & Padmini

Production 
Filming took place mostly at Citadel Studios in Kilpauk. The film was later dubbed into Hindi under the title Jeevan Tara.

Soundtrack 
Music was composed by S. V. Venkatraman while the lyrics were penned by Kambadasan and K. P. Kamatchisundaram.
Two songs "Vaanulaavum Tharai Nee en Ithaya Geethame" and "Odi Vaa Venmugil Poley", both sung by T. R. Mahalingam and T. R. Rajakumarai, became popular.

Reception 
Film historian Randor Guy opines that the film "did not prove to be a box office success as expected", although he praised the "impressive production values, tuneful music and the stunning Rajakumari."

References

External links 
 

1950 films
1950 romantic drama films
1950s historical drama films
1950s historical romance films
1950s Tamil-language films
Films directed by Joseph Thaliath Jr.
Indian black-and-white films
Indian historical romance films
Indian romantic drama films